Faktas is a 1981 Soviet Lithuanian-language war film directed by Almantas Grikevicius. It was entered into the 1981 Cannes Film Festival, where Yelena Solovey won the award for Best Supporting Actress.

Cast
 Regimantas Adomaitis
 Donatas Banionis
 Juozas Budraitis
 Uldis Dumpis
 Aleksandr Kaidanovsky
 Irena-Marija Leonaviciute
 Arnis Licitis
 Algimantas Masiulis
 Laimonas Noreika
 Yelena Solovey
 Leonid Obolensky
 Eugenija Pleskyte

References

External links

1981 films
1980s war films
Lithuanian-language films
Soviet-era Lithuanian films